The Perfect Marriage is a 1947 American comedy film directed by Lewis Allen and written by Leonard Spigelgass. The film stars Loretta Young, David Niven, Eddie Albert, Charlie Ruggles, Virginia Field, and Rita Johnson. The film was released on February 24, 1947, by Paramount Pictures.

Plot

Cast 
Loretta Young as Maggie Williams
David Niven as Dale Williams
Eddie Albert as Gil Cummins
Charlie Ruggles as Dale Williams, Sr.
Virginia Field as Gloria
Rita Johnson as Mabel Manning
ZaSu Pitts as Rosa
Nona Griffith as Cookie Williams
Nana Bryant as Corinne Williams
Jerome Cowan as Addison Manning
Luella Gear as Dolly Haggerty
Howard Freeman as Peter Haggerty

Reception
T.M.P. of The New York Times said, "Whatever it was about The Perfect Marriage which convinced Producer Hal Wallis that this Samson Raphaelson-play was worth the trouble and expense of filming just doesn't come through on the screen. For the new potpourri of comedy, farce and drama, which opened yesterday at the Paramount Theatre, is a singularly shapeless and unrewarding entertainment. Not being acquainted with the play, we wouldn't know whether Leonard Spigelgass, the scenarist, tampered to any great extent with the original. But (and this is the only thing that matters right now) it is quite evident that Mr. Spigelgass certainly didn't contribute any improvements. He wrote an abundance of dialogue, to be sure, but most of it is witless."

References

External links 
 

1947 films
1947 comedy films
American comedy films
American black-and-white films
American films based on plays
Films directed by Lewis Allen
Films produced by Hal B. Wallis
Films scored by Friedrich Hollaender
Paramount Pictures films
1940s English-language films
1940s American films